Beuvron-en-Auge (literally Beuvron in Auge) is a commune in the Calvados department and Normandy region of north-western France.

Beuvron is affiliated to Les Plus Beaux Villages de France ("the most beautiful villages of France"), an independent association of communes and communities of communes which seeks to promote as tourist destinations those small, picturesque French villages which meet its membership criteria.

Population

See also
Communes of the Calvados department

References

External links
 A brief history of Beuvron-en-Auge's restoration in the 1970s to become one of the prettiest villages in France.

Communes of Calvados (department)
Plus Beaux Villages de France
Calvados communes articles needing translation from French Wikipedia